Jens Berthelsen (17 December 1890 – 28 October 1961) was a Danish fencer. He competed at three Olympic Games. His father, Jens Peter Berthelsen, was also an Olympic fencer.

References

External links
 

1890 births
1961 deaths
Danish male fencers
Olympic fencers of Denmark
Fencers at the 1912 Summer Olympics
Fencers at the 1924 Summer Olympics
Fencers at the 1928 Summer Olympics
Sportspeople from Copenhagen